National University of Study and Research in Law (NUSRL) is a National Law University located in Ranchi, Jharkhand, India. It was established by a legislative act, by the State of Jharkhand (Act no. 4 of 2010) as the fourteenth National Law University of India.
Kesava Rao, Vurrakula is the present Vice-Chancellor of the university and he took the reins from the former Vice-Chancellor (In-charge) Gautam Kumar Choudhury. Earlier, he was the Vice-Chancellor (In-charge) of Damodaram Sanjivayya National Law University, Vishakhapatnam. A.K. Koul was the founding Vice-Chancellor of the university, who specialized in international trade law, especially WTO. Earlier he was the vice-chancellor of National Law University, Jodhpur.
The university is located on Kanke-Pithoria Road on the outskirts of Ranchi just ahead of Ranchi Institute of Neuro-Psychiatry & Allied Sciences and Birsa Agricultural University surrounded by Outer Ranchi Ring Road. It was formally inaugurated by the Chief Justice of Jharkhand High Court and Supreme Court Judge designate Justice Gyan Sudha Misra on 26 April 2010. The 63.76-acre site is among the largest National Law Universities in India. It was ranked 7th in the Qs world ranking of Indian law schools and continues to remain the12th best Law and research institute in the South East region in 2021, with its research editable reports in Harvard and Yale law journals.

Academics

The university has a semester system, i.e. 2 semesters in an academic year. Each academic year a student has to undertake 3 CAT (Continuous Assessment Test) for each subject, consisting of announced tests as well as unannounced ones. The students are also required to undertake compulsory CRE (Court Room Exercises). The number of CREs depends on the number of law subjects. The curriculum also includes compulsory Research Papers from the first semester itself.

Admissions
Admissions to NUSRL are done through the Common Law Admission Test (CLAT). Student preference shows that the university is faring well in the league of National Law Universities and remains a priority amongst the newly open National Law Universities.

Undergraduate
NUSRL offers undergraduates a five-year integrated B.A.LL.B(Hons). program which, upon completion, qualifies the student to sit for the bar to practice law in India.
The program is a mix of relevant social science subjects and law subjects. The time span for the course is 5 years divided into 10 semesters. In the first two years, the law student attends courses on English, Political Science, Philosophy, Economics, Sociology, Psychology and Legal History alongside standard legal subjects, such as Law of Torts, Law of Contracts, Constitutional law, Family Law, Criminal Law and Civil Procedure. In the latter three the curriculum consists majorly of legal subjects.

Postgraduate
At the postgraduate level, the university offers one-year LL.M and two-year Ph.D. programms, for which the admission is through an entrance test, group discussion and oral test conducted by the university.

NUSRL Library
The university is equipped with an extensive library covering all subjects of law. Besides legal subjects, the library also has books on social sciences. The library also has acquired subscription to various online databases such as Manupatra, HeinOnline, WestLaw India, Jstor and SCC OnLine. The university also houses a wide range of law journals.

Moot Court Committee

The Moot Court Committee (MCC) of National University Of Study And Research in Law, Ranchi (NUSRL) was established in the year 2011 with Dr. K. Syamala as its chairperson. The Moot Court Association has been constantly receiving overwhelming response for participation in various moot court competitions. The university is also excelling in various National Moot Court Competitions.
The MCC, NUSRL is currently headed and chaired by Dr. K. Syamala, along with faculty and student members. The MCC organized the 1st NUSRL National Trial Advocacy Competition, 2015 which saw participation of 18 law universities from India. After the successful completion of the first edition, National University of Study & Research in Law, Ranchi organized the 2nd NUSRL National Trial Advocacy Competition, 2017.
The 3rd edition of NUSRL National Trial Advocacy Competition was held from May 17–20, 2018 which witnessed a great participation from different law schools all across the country.
The MCC also organizes the O.P. Jalan Memorial National Taxation Moot Court Competition. The first edition was held from March 31, 2016 - April 2, 2016 and second edition from March 16–18, 2018.

Centre for Research in Intellectual Property Right (IPR)

The Centre was founded in response to an escalating need felt by scientists, lawyers, technologists and companies. The object is to gain a thoughtful knowledge in patent, trademarks, design and copyright law. More in meticulous the CSRIPR wishes to gain a better insight and glimpse into new and evolving areas of intellectual property law (such as the protection of software, semi-conductor products and biotechnological inventions, standardisation and technology transfers) and the general problems of patents, trademarks, designs and copyright. To achieve these objects the CSRIPR has organized a manifold of activities on an interdisciplinary level. The CSRIPR has organized various seminars and conference relating to the field of IPR. The Director of the centre is Dr. M.R.S Murthy.

Centre for Legal Aid Programme (CLAP)

Center for Legal Aid and Program, NUSRL (CLAP) is a student-cum-faculty-run society with an aim to spread legal awareness and give real-time effective legal aid to the marginalized section of our society.  CLAP was established in the very first year of the inception of the university. CLAP seeks to improve the legal scenario in the state of Jharkhand. It has organized various field trips and conducted surveys and seminars all over the State of Jharkhand so as to spread legal awareness amongst the weaker section of the society. The committee is headed by Mr. Kaushik Bagchi.

Sports activities

The university is very active when it comes to extracurricular activities, especially in sports. The Sports Committee of NUSRL is headed and chaired by Dr. Gunjan. The university organises an Inter- Batch Sports Tournament every semester, in which the students of the university actively participate which includes team events like Cricket, Football, Basketball, Volleyball, Throwball and Badminton and Lawn Tennis in individual events. Apart from it, there are several premier league during the semester. The university has organized NUSRL Cricket Premier League (Teams – Invaders, RDX, Sabers, and Pipers) and NUSRL Football premier league (Teams- Invaders, Tornadoes, Renegade, Encounters ). The students of the university have brought laurels by participating and winning in various national sports fests organized by other universities all across the country. The students have also organised a NUSRL Gully Cricket League, NUSRL  Basketball Premier League, NUSRL Underground Premier League and Volleyball Premier League.
And to organise such large scale events, the University has Basketball Courts, Lawn Tennis courts, Football-cum-Cricket ground, Volleyball court and Badminton courts.

Fests & Cultural Events
The University organizes its Annual fest named as Ulgulan. Ulgulan 2016 witnessed a footfall of around 5,000 visitors from PAN-India. The second edition of Ulgulan was held in the year 2017 which also saw a massive participation. Apart from the inter- university fest Ulgulan, the Cultural Committee of NUSRL organizes the intra-university cultural fest "Yuventas" which unites the spirit of the students. The Mess Committee of the university also organizes a food fest every month. Every food fest has a different theme and sumptuous dishes.

Publication

The university annually publishes NUSRL Journal of Law and Policy. Besides this the university has also published CSRIPR Diary, Journal of Constitutional Law and Governance, NUSRL Journal of Intellectual Property Rights and many others journals.

Accommodation
The university currently accommodates its male and female students in on-campus four-storied hostels of around 300 rooms which are well equipped with amenities like wi-fi, hot running water and parking space for local students and faculty members.

References

External links

Law schools in Jharkhand
National Law Universities
Universities and colleges in Ranchi
2010 establishments in Jharkhand
Educational institutions established in 2010
State universities in Jharkhand